, provisional designation , is a binary and plutino. It consists of two components less than 60 kilometers in diameter, orbiting at a distance of  21000 km.

Mors–Somnus was discovered on 14 October 2007, by American astronomers Scott Sheppard and Chad Trujillo with the Subaru telescope at Mauna Kea Observatories in Hawaii, United States. It was later named after the twins Mors and Somnus from Roman mythology.

Orbit and binarity 

Mors–Somnus is a small double plutino occupying the 3:2 mean motion resonance with Neptune. The object is a wide optically resolved binary with the following orbital parameters:

The components has almost equal size.

Physical properties 

For a realistic minimal density of 0.5 g/cm3 the albedo is >0.17 and the size of the components is <60 km. The Collaborative Asteroid Lightcurve Link assumes an albedo of 0.1 and calculates a diameter of 175.20 kilometers based on an absolute magnitude of 6.9.

Mors–Somnus has an ultra-red spectrum in the visible and near-infrared parts of the spectrum. The colors of two components are indistinguishable from each other. It demonstrates a double-peaked light curve with the period of about 9.28 hours and amplitude of 0.24. This indicates that either primary of secondary has an elongated shape and rotates non-synchronuosly.

Evolution 

The Mors–Somnus system is likely to be an escaped cold classical Kuiper belt object.

Naming 

The minor planet was named after the mythological twin Roman gods of death (Mors) and sleep (Somnus). The approved naming citation was published by the Minor Planet Center on 2 June 2015.

References

External links 
 Asteroid Lightcurve Database (LCDB), query form (info )
 Dictionary of Minor Planet Names, Google books
 Discovery Circumstances: Numbered Minor Planets (340001)-(345000) – Minor Planet Center
 
 

341520
Discoveries by Scott S. Sheppard
Discoveries by Chad Trujillo
Named minor planets
Binary trans-Neptunian objects
20071014